Darren Main (born January 20, 1971) is a yoga teacher and author currently living in San Francisco. He has written largely about Eastern spirituality for a more modern and Western audience.  Main is best known for his second book, Yoga and the Path of the Urban Mystic. He has written several other books: Inner Tranquility: A Guide to Seated Meditation",  "Spiritual Journeys Along the Yellow Brick Road"; a controversial book, "Hearts and Minds: Talking to Christians About Homosexuality"  and "The Yogi Entrepreneur: a Guide to Earning a Mindful Living Through Yoga Main's writing has been translated in various languages and several of his books have been released in numerous editions.

Main also maintains a podcast called "Inquire Within" in which he interviews various individuals on topics such as healing, spiritualism, and social activism.

Early years
Main was born in Westerly, RI to John and Kathy Main (now Kathy Ascare).  Main also has a brother, Jason Main and a sister, Jennifer Main.  He is the single father to an adopted son. 

Main's adolescent years were “filled with pain, rage and confusion” which led to drug abuse and depression.  After a suicide attempt, Main claimed to have had a spiritual awakening.  This spiritual awakening led Main to Alcoholics Anonymous and to Narcotics Anonymous and to Hatha Yoga and Meditation.  Main also became a student of A Course in Miracles.

Education
Main studied Social Work at Mohegan community College, Community College of Rhode Island and at Rhode Island College.  He also studied massage therapy at the Bancroft School of Massage Therapy in Worcester, MA and trained to become a yoga and meditation instructor at The Kripalu Center in Lenox, MA.

Teaching Yoga and Meditation
Main began teaching yoga in Providence, RI in 1992. He spent a year teaching in Bozeman, MT in 1993. Main moved to San Francisco, CA in 1994 where he currently teaches.  In 1998, Main opened a San Francisco yoga studio, Castro Yoga with David Nelson.  In 2000, Castro Yoga closed and Main began teaching for San Francisco's largest yoga studio,Yoga Tree.  In addition to his weekly yoga classes and various workshops, Main is also the Director of Yoga Tree's Teacher Training program.  His books have become required text in a number of yoga teacher certification programs throughout the United States.

Shortly after his first book was released in 1999, Main began teaching throughout the United States and internationally.

Yoga on the Labyrinth
Main teaches one of the largest weekly yoga classes in the world at San Francisco's iconic Grace Cathedral . This donation-based yoga class features renowned recording artists and musicians playing live music and attracts as many as 700 students per week. The class has been featured in local as well as national press and has been criticized by some conservative Christian groups. 

In April 2006, Main founded a Naked Yoga for Men group in San Francisco and began teaching naked yoga (for men) at Mission Yoga. .  link to BAR article:

Writing
Main is the author of several books including:
 Yoga and the Path of the Urban Mystic
 Inner Tranquility: A Guide to Seated Meditation
 Spiritual Journeys Along the Yellow Brick Road
 Hearts and Minds: Talking to Christians About Homosexuality 
 "The Yogi Entrepreneur: A Guide to Earning a Mindful Living Through Yoga"

Main also writes articles and has contributed to Gay.com, White Crain Journal and the Kaiser Permanente HIV Update Newsletter.

External links
DarrenMain.Com

Yoga on the Labyrinth
SF Gate
 SF Bay Guardian
 Grace Cathedral
Museum of Idolatry

1971 births
Living people
Writers from San Francisco
American yoga teachers
People from Westerly, Rhode Island